Eugene McCabe (7 July 1930 – 27 August 2020) was a Scots-born Irish novelist, short story writer, playwright, and television screenwriter. John Banville said McCabe was "in the first rank of contemporary Irish novelists'.

Biography

Born to Irish emigrants in Glasgow, Scotland, he moved with his family to Ireland in the early 1940s. He lived on a farm near Lackey Bridge, just outside Clones in County Monaghan. He was educated at Castleknock College.

His play King of the Castle caused a minor scandal when first staged in 1964, and was protested by the League of Decency. McCabe wrote his award-winning trilogy of television plays, consisting of Cancer, Heritage and Siege, because he felt he had to make a statement about the Troubles. His 1992 novel Death and Nightingales was hailed by Irish writer Colm Tóibín as "one of the great Irish masterpieces of the century" and a "classic of our times" by Kirkus Reviews. 

He defended fellow novelist Dermot Healy, who had been negatively reviewed by Eileen Battersby in The Irish Times in 2011, using the Joycean invective "shite and onions", provoking controversy in the Irish literary community.

Fintan O'Toole noted how living in Monaghan, just across the border from Fermanagh, informed McCabe's writing, and described him as "the great laureate of...indeterminacy, charting its inevitably tragic outcomes while holding somehow to the notion that it might someday become a blessing."

Eugene McCabe died on 27 August 2020, aged 90. He is survived by his wife Margot, his four children, Ruth, Marcus, Patrick and Stephen, and thirteen grandchildren.

List of works

Plays
 A Matter of Conscience (1962)
 King of the Castle (1964)
 Pull Down a Horseman (1966)
 Breakdown (1966)
 Swift (1969)
 Gale Day (1979)
 Victims (1981)

Television plays
 Cancer (1973)
 Heritage (1973)
 Siege (1973)
 Roma (1979)

Novel
 Death and Nightingales (1992)

Novella
 The love of sisters (2009)

Short story collections
 Victims: A Tale from Fermanagh (1976)
 Heritage and Other Stories (1978)
 Christ in the Fields, A Fermanagh Trilogy (1993)
 Tales from the Poor House (1999)
 Heaven Lies about Us (2005)

Children's books
 Cyril: The Quest of an Orphaned Squirrel (1987)
 Cyril's Woodland Quest (2001)

Non-fiction
 Shadows from the Pale: Portrait of an Irish Town (1996)

References

External links
 Eugene McCabe answers questions about Death and Nightingales
 Colm Tóibín reads the short story "Music at Annahullian" by Eugene McCabe
 A Tribute to Eugene McCabe
 Review John Banville, The Boston Globe: With the sorrowing stories of Heaven Lies About Us, Eugene McCabe gets to the heart of the Irish predicament

1930 births
2020 deaths
Scottish people of Irish descent
Irish male dramatists and playwrights
Irish male short story writers
People from Clones, County Monaghan
20th-century Irish dramatists and playwrights
20th-century Irish novelists
20th-century Irish male writers
Irish male novelists
21st-century Irish dramatists and playwrights
21st-century Irish novelists
20th-century Irish short story writers
21st-century Irish short story writers
21st-century Irish male writers